The Society for Sedimentary Geology is an international not-for-profit, scientific society based in Oklahoma. It is commonly referred to by its acronym SEPM, which refers to its former name, the Society of Economic Paleontologists and Mineralogists.

The Society’s reason for being is to disseminate scientific information on sedimentology, stratigraphy, paleontology, environmental sciences, marine geology, hydrogeology, and related specialties. Members benefit from both gaining and exchanging information pertinent to their geologic specialties. Information is dispersed via the publication of two major scientific journals, the Journal of Sedimentary Research (JSR) and PALAIOS, and the organization of technical conferences and short courses. It also publishes a monthly magazine for its members, The Sedimentary Record, which is now a Diamond Open Access journal.

Conferences 
The Society arranges research conferences based on topics that are relevant to members and show promise of progress. They are meant to focus the attention of specialists with diverse expertise on some theme of mutual interest and stimulate new research areas or approaches. They are designed to encourage summaries of new, incomplete research, and invite open speculation. Field trips, poster sessions, core workshops, and laboratory experiments are often included as part of a conference.

Awards 
Annually the Society recognizes people who have contributed to the various areas of sedimentary geology. The awardees are nominated by members of the Society, but do not have to be members themselves. These medals are named in recognition of outstanding geologists. 
 William H. Twenhofel Medal, the highest award, for Outstanding Contributions to Sedimentary Geology, named for William H. Twenhofel
 Francis P. Shepard Medal for Marine Geology, named for Francis Shepard
 Raymond C. Moore Medal for Paleontology, named for Raymond C. Moore
 Francis J. Pettijohn Medal for Sedimentology, named for Francis J. Pettijohn
 William Dickenson Medal for an impactful mid-career sedimentary geoscientist, named for William Dickenson
 James Lee Wilson Award for Sedimentary Geology by a young scientist, named for James Lee Wilson

The Society also bestows, at its discretion, Honorary Membership and a Distinguished Service Award to Society members.

External links 
Society for Sedimentary Geology website
  SEPMSTRATA-an educational website for sedimentary geology

Geology societies
Sedimentology
Stratigraphy
Scientific societies based in the United States
Non-profit organizations based in Oklahoma